Pterostylis woollsii, commonly known as the long-tailed rustyhood, is a plant in the orchid family Orchidaceae and is endemic to eastern Australia. It has a rosette of leaves at its base and up to six transparent flowers which have unusually long tips on their lateral sepals and a reddish-brown, insect-like labellum.

Description
Pterostylis woollsii, is a terrestrial,  perennial, deciduous, herb with an underground tuber. The leaves are often withered by the time of flowering. Each flower is carried on the end of a long, thin stalk. Two to five stem leaves are wrapped around the flowering spike. The lateral sepals are turned downwards and are wider than the galea. They are shallowly dished, densely hairy on their outer edges and suddenly taper to a thread-like tip, . Flowering occurs from October to December.

Taxonomy and naming
Pterostylis woollsii was first formally described in 1876 by Robert D. FitzGerald and the description was published in his book Australian Orchids. Fitzgerald gave the specific epithet (woollsii) "after my friend, Dr. Woolls, who has contributed so largely to the knowledge of Botany in New South Wales, and who kindly sent me specimens discovered by him growing in the neighbourhood of Richmond".

Distribution and habitat
The long-tailed rustyhood has a widespread but disjunct distribution in New South Wales where it grows in forest in grassy or rocky places. It also occurs in Queensland as far north as Carnarvon Gorge but in Victoria it is only known from the Rushworth area.

Conservation
Pterostylis woollsii is classified as "endangered" in Victoria under the Victorian Government Flora and Fauna Guarantee Act 1988.

References

woollsii
Endemic orchids of Australia
Orchids of New South Wales
Orchids of Queensland
Orchids of Victoria (Australia)
Plants described in 1876